The Gurgel Itaipu E400 was a Brazilian electric vehicle with a plastic body. It was produced between 1981 and 1983. It was produced in two types: van and pickup. The car was essentially a rebodied Volkswagen Type 2 ("Kombi"), fitted with an electric engine and batteries. The design was similar overall, but with a rounded, bulbous nose. Its very limited range and expensive batteries resulted in it being a commercial failure. Gurgel had already built the Itaipu E150 city car, which was followed by the Itaipu E400 electric van. Around 200 were produced overall, nearly entirely for Brazilian government agencies. One single example was bought by a private owner.

References

External links
 Photos
 Site in Portuguese

1980s cars
E400
Pickup trucks
Electric vans
Vans